The Show (previously The Show: All New K-Pop (season 2), The Show: All About K-Pop (season 3)) is a South Korean music television program broadcast by SBS M. It airs live every Tuesday and is broadcast from the SBS Prism Tower in Sangam-dong, Seoul, South Korea.

Since January 2019, The Show is broadcast live to over 20 countries through Paramount Network, MTV France and on TBS in Japan.

Chart system
The Shows chart system was introduced at the beginning of its fourth season which started on October 28, 2014 and was named The Show Choice. This chart tracking from Saturday to Friday.

The three nominees are chosen from the starring singers every week and the winner of The Show Choice is determined based on the following criteria:

Based source and explanations for each criteria:

 Broadcast: Number of times that a songs played on SBS MTV
 Digital sales: Number of streaming and download based on Gaon digital chart.
 Physical album: Number of copies based on Hanteo album chart
 Professional judges or critics' choice: Score based on judgement by SBS MTV's staff
 Video views or SNS: YouTube views, counted from official MV only.
 Voting and netizen ranking''': Voting and netizen choices happens before show start. Currently via Starpass. Previously method includes Starplay (for pre-vote and live-vote, used until the end of 2020) and text message (use from 2014 to 2017 and January 26, 2021 - February 23, 2021).

Hosts

Season 1
Luna, Hyoseong (April 15 – September 30, 2011) 
Himchan, Hyeri (October 7 – December 16, 2011)

Season 2
Lee Min-hyuk, Yook Sung-jae (March 23 – October 19, 2012)
Zico, P.O (October 26 – December 21, 2012)

Season 3
Gyuri, Seungyeon (October 8, 2013 – May 27, 2014)
Jiyeon, Hyeri, Jung Wook (June 3 – October 21, 2014)

Season 4
Hyeri (October 28, 2014 – January 20, 2015)
Hongbin (March 3, 2015 – October 13, 2015)
Jiyeon, Zhou Mi (October 28, 2014 – December 8, 2015)

Season 5
Zhou Mi (January 26, 2016 – August 2, 2016)
Yerin (January 26, 2016 – September 6, 2016)
Somi, Wooshin (October 11, 2016 – April 25, 2017)
P.O, Jeonghwa, Yeonwoo (May 16, 2017 – August 29, 2017)
Youngjae, JooE, Hohyeon (October 17, 2017 – May 8, 2018)

Season 6
Yeeun, Jeno, Jin Longguo (May 22, 2018 – October 23, 2018)
Yeeun, Jeno (October 30, 2018 – November 26, 2019)
Tag, Dayoung, Bae Jin-young (December 3, 2019)
Juyeon, Sihyeon, Kim Min-kyu (February 11, 2020 – February 2, 2021)
Yeosang, Kim Yo-han, Jihan (March 2, 2021 – December 14, 2021)
Yeosang, Kang Min-hee, Kim Chae-hyun (January 25, 2022 – March 14, 2023)
Yeosang, Xiaojun, Hyeongseop (March 21, 2023 – present)

The Show Choice winners
2014

2015

2016

2017

2018

2019

2020

2021 – present

Achievements by artists
List of most The Show Choice wins

List of top 10 highest scores
Top 10 highest scores (October 28, 2014 – present)

List of Triple Crowns

 Similar programs 
Mnet M CountdownSBS InkigayoKBS Music BankMBC Show! Music CoreArirang TV Pops in SeoulArirang TV Simply K-Pop (formerly called The M-Wave and Wave K)
JTBC Music on TopJTBC Music Universe K-909MBC M Show Champion''

See also
Music programs of South Korea

References

External links 
 The Show – Official website 

2011 South Korean television series debuts
South Korean music chart television shows
Korean-language television shows